Mark Ward is a football player from Ireland. As of 2009, he played with Navan O'Mahonys. He holds a county medal which he won playing Sigerson football for University College Dublin. He has been a member of the senior Meath county football team.

External links
Hoganstand.com - Ward denies quit story - 2009

1985 births
Living people
Meath inter-county Gaelic footballers
Navan O'Mahoneys Gaelic footballers
People educated at Castleknock College